This is a list of state correctional facilities in the Commonwealth of Massachusetts. It does not include federal prisons or houses of correction located in Massachusetts (known in other states as county jails). All of the following prisons are under the jurisdiction of the Massachusetts Department of Correction.

Former facilities
 Bay State Correctional Center
 Charlestown State Prison
 Massachusetts Correctional Institution - Lancaster
 Massachusetts Correctional Institution - Shirley Minimum
 Southeastern Correctional Center
 Massachusetts Alcohol and Substance Abuse Center - Bridgewater

References

External links 
 Massachusetts Department of Correction

 
Prisons
Massachusetts
Correctional facilities